"Häschenparty" (Bunny party) is the third single released by Schnuffel, featuring Michael Wendler, on 19 September 2008, by Sony BMG Germany (Sony BMG). It was also released as a single premium in the same date. "Häschenparty" was seemingly more successful than the previous single "Ich hab' Dich lieb", as it peaked at No. 16 in Germany, and at No. 24 in the European charts. On September 20, 2008, a live concert took place in the KöPi-Arena in Oberhausen, Germany, featuring a person dressed as Schnuffel "singing" along with Michael Wendler. That day, over 13,000 fans attended the concert.  It is the 16th track of the album Ich hab' Dich lieb Gold Edition. Both in the normal and Gold Edition of the album, there is also the song "Häschenparty (Album version)" as the 9th track. The single is also present in a digital release called "Häschenparty - Famous 5" (released on October 24, 2008), together with the album version. "ZEILT productions" was the producer of the 3D animation as seen in the official music video.

Track listing

German basic CD single
"Häschenparty" (single version) – 3:09
"Häschenparty" (bunny's radio edit) – 3:17

German maxi-CD single
"Häschenparty" (single version) – 3:09
"Häschenparty" (bunny's radio edit) – 3:17
"Häschenparty" (disco maxi mix) – 3:46
"Häschenparty" (album version) – 2:42
"Häschenparty (album version)" (enhanced videoclip) – 2:44

French CD single
 "La fête des Lapins" – 2:42
 "Lapins Câlin - La chanson des bisous" (vidéo clip) – 2:50 

International editions
 2008: Bunny Party (English version) (by Snuggle) 
 2008: Kaninparty (Swedish version) (by Kramis) 
 2008: A festa dos coelhinhos (Portuguese version) (by Orelhinhas) 
 2008: Hipp-hopp party (Hungarian version) (by Snufi) 
 2008: Тусовка Зайцев (Russian version)  (by Зайчик Шнуфель / Shnuffel bunny) 
 2009: Pupubileet (Finnish version)  (by Snuffel) 
 2009: La fête des lapins (French version) (by Lapin Câlin) 
 2009: Snufi Fiesta (Spanish version) (by Snufi) 
 2010: Festa dei coniglietti (Italian version) (by Kikolo) 
 2014: Festa do Coelhinho (Normal version and Samba Remix) (Brazilian Portuguese version) (Schnuffel Coelhinho)

Charts

References

2008 singles
Schnuffel songs